Carl W. Kroening (April 19, 1928 – June 29, 2017) was an American politician and educator.

Born in Minneapolis, Minnesota, Kroening graduated from John Marshall High School He served in the United States Army during the Korean War and was a master sergeant. Kroening received his bachelor's and master's degrees from the University of Minnesota. Kroening taught chemistry and was a former high school principal. Kroening served in the Minnesota House of Representatives from 1975 to 1981 and was a Democrat; he then served in the Minnesota Senate from 1981 to 1997.

References

1928 births
2017 deaths
Democratic Party members of the Minnesota House of Representatives
Democratic Party Minnesota state senators
University of Minnesota alumni
American school principals
Educators from Minnesota
Politicians from Minneapolis
Military personnel from Minnesota
United States Army personnel of the Korean War